Daniel Smick (December 24, 1915 – April 6, 1975) was an American professional basketball and minor league baseball player. In basketball, Smick played primarily for amateur and semi-professional teams, but did spend one season in National Basketball League (1947–48) playing for the Flint Dow A.C.'s. In baseball, he competed for the Bloomington Bloomers, Tarboro Serpents/Goobers, Wausau Timberjacks, and Lansing Senators between 1939 and 1941.

Smick played football, basketball, and baseball at the University of Michigan.

References

1915 births
1975 deaths
American men's basketball players
Baseball players from Michigan
Basketball players from Michigan
Bloomington Bloomers players
Centers (basketball)
Flint Dow A.C.'s players
Forwards (basketball)
Lansing Senators players
Michigan Wolverines baseball players
Michigan Wolverines football players
Michigan Wolverines men's basketball players
People from Olyphant, Pennsylvania
People from Hazel Park, Michigan
Players of American football from Michigan
Tarboro Serpents players
Wausau Timberjacks players